José María Díaz Muñoz (born 4 July 1982) is a Spanish professional footballer who is currently a free agent.

Club career
José María joined Hong Kong First Division League side Kitchee in January 2011.

References

External links
 
 
 José María Díaz Muñoz at HKFA

1982 births
Living people
Footballers from Murcia
Spanish footballers
Association football midfielders
Segunda División players
Segunda División B players
Tercera División players
Real Murcia players
Gimnàstic de Tarragona footballers
Burgos CF footballers
Talavera CF players
Hong Kong First Division League players
Kitchee SC players
Sun Hei SC players
Southern District FC players
Spanish expatriate footballers
Expatriate footballers in Hong Kong
CD Binéfar players
Hong Kong League XI representative players